Sharrona Pearl (May 3, 1977) is a Canadian-American historian and theorist of the face and writer who teaches at Drexel University.

Background and education
She was raised in Toronto, Canada, and graduated from the Community Hebrew Academy of Toronto in 1995. She earned her bachelor’s of arts degree summa cum laude from York University in 1999, and was awarded her doctorate in the History of Science from Harvard University in 2006.  She has studied abroad at both the Hebrew University of Jerusalem and Cambridge University.  Pearl has taught at Harvard University, MIT, The University of Pennsylvania, and Drexel University.

Scholarship and Academic Career
Pearl has written several articles (both scholarly and popular) exploring the role of the face as a cultural object and the framework for human relationships and communication.  She focuses on critical race, 
gender, sexuality, and disability studies to understand how we make sense of the faces of others and what that says about ourselves. Pearl’s research has been widely cited in the emerging field of face studies and in debates around the ethics of face transplant surgery, and she is regularly interviewed on the subject.
 
Pearl’s first book, About Faces: Physiognomy in Nineteenth-Century Britain,  explored the history of physiognomy, the study of facial features and their relationship to character; when an interviewer asked her to read his face, Pearl quipped that if she studied the history of obstetrics, she would not be asked to deliver his baby.  Her second book, Face/On: Face Transplants and the Ethics of the Other  chronicled the history, ethics, and medical, bioethical, and journalistic debates around face transplant surgery.  Pearl pointed out the role of the military in funding research on face transplants, and explored how television coverage of face transplant recipients followed the logic of makeover television.  A review in Social History of Medicine called Face/On “a significant and timely book,” noting that “Pearl writes beautifully and polemically, with a genuine passion for her subject.”

Pearl has served as the Geddes W. Simpson Distinguished Lecturer at the University of Maine, and as the keynote speaker for the William A. Kern Conference in Visual Communication at Cal Tech, and as a visiting scholar at Johns Hopkins University. Pearl has received numerous grants and awards, including the Louis and Bessie Stein Family Fellowship in 2020 and a Rapid Response Grant to explore the racial resonances of masking during the pandemic.

Freelance Writing
Pearl has written op-eds, essays, and commentary for the Washington Post, Tablet Magazine, Real Life Magazine, Aeon Magazine, Lilith Magazine, and numerous other publications.

Religious Life
In addition to her research and writing on faces, Pearl writes regularly on Judaism, social justice, community life, and religious observance, including essays in Kveller, Lilith Magazine,  Tablet Magazine,  The Revealer,  and elsewhere.

Personal life
Pearl is married to Ben Knepler, the co-founder of True Places.  They have 3 children and live in Philadelphia.

References

1977 births
Living people
Drexel University faculty
Massachusetts Institute of Technology faculty
University of Pennsylvania faculty
York University alumni
Harvard University alumni